Brigadier General Rahmatullah Safi (born 1948) is an Afghan former army officer and mujahideen commander who fought during the Soviet–Afghan War. He was later claimed to have been the representative of the Taliban movement in Europe.

Formerly a colonel in the Royal Afghan Army, he trained an elite commando force of 1,600 men during the reign of king Zahir Shah. When Mohammed Daoud Khan took power, he left Afghanistan for England where he was trained by Britain's MI6. Following the Soviet invasion of Afghanistan in 1979, he joined the National Islamic Front of Afghanistan, a mujahideen party led by Pir Sayyed Ahmed Gailani. He and his officers were trained by Britain's MI6 as a pledge to support the resistance against the Soviet Union. He and his men would return a year later an set up his base in Peshawar.

As a mujahideen commander, Rahmatullah Safi operated in Paktia and Kunar provinces, taking part in the 1986 Zhawar fighting. He was in charge of NIFA's training facilities, where he claimed to have trained some 8,000 mujahideen, possibly with British assistance. In 1985 Safi led a delegation of mujaheddin to the United States, where the general spoke at colleges and universities in more than a dozen US cities. Safi was hospitalized in Pittsburgh in 1986 for cardiac evaluation tests; his medical bills were paid by donations and the Committee for a Free Afghanistan.

In 1998, Safi was living in London, England, but departed to Afghanistan along with Nabi Misdak to convince Mullah Omar to hand over Osama bin Laden to foreign authorities; and he was considered the representative of the Taliban in Europe according to a United Nations Security Council press release.

In 2004, Safi resigned his military commission and announced his intention to run in the 2004 Afghan presidential election.

References

1948 births
Living people
Mujahideen members of the Soviet–Afghan War
Taliban members
National Islamic Front of Afghanistan politicians
Deobandis